Lawrence Gerrard O'Connor (September 22, 1916 – September 6, 1995) was a Canadian sprinter and hurdler. He placed sixth in the 110 m hurdles at the 1936 Summer Olympics. At the 1938 Empire Games he was a member of the Canadian relay team that won the gold medal in the 4×110 yards event. In the 120 yards hurdles competition he won the bronze medal and in the 220 yards contest he finished fourth.

References

1916 births
1995 deaths
Canadian male sprinters
Canadian male hurdlers
Olympic track and field athletes of Canada
Athletes (track and field) at the 1936 Summer Olympics
Athletes (track and field) at the 1938 British Empire Games
Commonwealth Games gold medallists for Canada
Commonwealth Games silver medallists for Canada
Commonwealth Games medallists in athletics
People from Cobourg
Track and field athletes from Ontario
Medallists at the 1938 British Empire Games